Parineetii (Destiny) is an Indian Hindi-language romantic drama television series that premiered on 14 February 2022 on Colors TV. It digitally streams on Voot. Produced by Ekta Kapoor and Shobha Kapoor under the banner of Balaji Telefilms, it stars Anchal Sahu, Tanvi Dogra, Ankur Verma

Plot
Parineet Kakkar and Neetii Juneja are two friends who are together known as Parineetii. Rajeev Bajwa is a fun living boy, while his mother finding a girl for him. With some circumstances in Parineet and Varun's marriage, Rajeev marries Parineet. Though he doesn't like Parineet, he marries her just for his mother's sake. Gurinder wanted to become the biggest landholder in the village. Rajeev moves to Chandigarh leaving Parineet in the Kakkar house.

3 months later 
Rajeev is living in Chandigarh as Sanju Mehra in his aunt's house with his cousins. Neetii is completing her Air Hostess course in Chandigarh. Parineet is still in Kakkar house. Jaswanth dies in a college. Mandeep drops Parineet in Chandigarh. Parineet meets with Neetii and stays with her. Rajeev proposes Neetii in a party and Neetii accepts the proposal, unknowing that Rajeev is Parineet's husband.

Rajeev proposes Neetii for marriage and she agrees. Meanwhile, Rakesh's goons stab Rajeev with a knife, Parineet saves Rajeev. Rajeev writes in a letter that he cannot marry Neetii but that letter is read by her mother Sukhvinder instead of Neetii. Before, Sukhvinder tells this to Neetii, she gets shot. Sukhvinder survives but fear sets in her that she will die in a few days and she forces Rajeev to marry Neetii so that Rajeev can take care of her daughter in her absence and under pressure, Rajeev agrees to the marriage and marries Neeti without telling Parineet. Parineet starts having suspiscion on Rajeev after she sees lipstick mark on his shirt. Neetii suggests Parineet to follow Rajeev. The same night Rajeev has a dinner plan with Neetii but Parineet follows him.But later is fooled by Rajeev again. Rajeev's Best friend invites Rajeev and his wife for his Sangeet. He asks Neetii who refuses at first as she has to go back to work but somehow the work gets cancelled and she gets another week leave then she tells it to Rajeev in a excited mood who is left in a shock as he has informed Parineet to come. However Rakesh arrives to Chandigarh to separate Rajeev and Parineet. He and his goons kidnap Neetii and escapes and met with an accident. Parineet takes her to hospital however,truth is revealed that Sanju and Rajeev are same man. Parineet starts hating Rajeev however Rajeev grandmother arrives in his house. She announces the remarriage of Rajeev and Parineet. Parineet is heartbroken. On the remarriage day, Parineet reveals Rajeev's double truth to everyone. All were shocked. Parineet finds that Neetii is pregnant with Rajeev's child. Parineet is devastated by the news. She visits a Devi temple and then decides to suicide in order to save Neetii and Rajeev's relation just for the sake of Neetii. Rajeev and his family members search for Parineet but then assume that Parineet is no more when they see her Dupatta near the hill. But Parineet is alive, it was Rajeev's thought of Parineet as dead. Parineet reveals the truth of Neetii's Pregnancy and latter after a big emotional conversation the Bajwa family is ready to accept Neetii. In this way Parineet is able to fulfill her promise to Neetii but later thinks about her decision whether it was good or bad. Parineet is heartbroken to see Rajeev's immense love for Neetii that she never got and successfully after a big fuss Neetii is warmly welcomed in the Bajwa household. Gurinder tries to back down Parineet by organising various Rasams, in order to hurt Parineet more.But Parineet for the sake of Neetii tolerates all the hurtings .Parineet during the Muh-Dikhai rasam notices that one of the guest visited them during Parineet's Muh-Dikhai rasam. In order to save Parminder's respect Parineet soon with the help of Chandrika and Amit fix the problem.Rajeev feels guilty for his actions towards Parineet.Rajeev tries to apologise but Parineet rejects his apology for what he had done

Soon the day of Karwa Chawth comes and as many other brides Neetii wants to fast for Rajeev for his long life. Nobody knows that Parineet too had kept fast for Rajeev's long life.Parminder has a doubt on Parineet whether she had kept the fast or not and later after lying Parineet proves that she has not kept any fast. During the time of breaking the fast Parineet faints down as she had kept the fast for the entire day. Rajeev then breaks her fast. Parineet then finally decides to leave Bajwa mansion by telling everybody that Rajeev had called her. Parminder then asks Parineet the reason for which replies that she wants Neetii to happily live with Sanju (Rajeev) and after a emotional talk with Parminder and handing over the Mangalsutra to Rajeev, Parineet finally leaves for barnala.

Cast

Main
Anchal Sahu as Parineet "Pari" Kakkar Bajwa: Jaswant and Gurpreet's elder daughter; Nupur's sister; Vikram and Simar's cousin;  Neetii's best friend; Rajeev's first wife;  (2022–present)
Tanvi Dogra as Neetii Juneja : Sukhwinder's daughter; Parineet's best friend; Rajeev's second wife (2022–present)
Ankur Verma as Rajeev Bajwa aka Sanju Mehra: Gurinder and Karanvir's son; Amit and Keerti's brother; Parineet's and Neetii's husband (2022–present)

Recurring
Aman Gandhi as Vishal: Rajeev's friend, fake Rajeev (2022–present)
Vishal Solanki as Rakesh Singh Ahlawat: Parineet's obsessive lover, Rajeev's enemy(2022–present)
Ashish Dixit as Vikram Kakkar: Mandeep and Harman's son; Simar's brother; Parineet and Nupur's cousin (2022)
Coral Bhamra / Ankita Singh Bamb as Simmi Bajwa: Parminder and Rajveer's daughter; Balwinder and Monty's sister; Rajeev, Amit and Keerti's cousin (2022–present)
Abhinandan Singh as Balwinder Bajwa: Parminder and Rajveer's son; Monty and Simmi's brother; Rajeev, Amit and Keerti's cousin; Mishika's father (2022–present)
Dolly Sohi as Gurpreet Kakkar: Jaswant's widow; Parineet and Nupur's mother (2022–present) 
Kaushal Kapoor as Jaswant Kakkar: Harman's brother; Gurpreet's husband, Parineet and Nupur's father (2022) 
Khushi Bharadwaj as Nupur Kakkar: Jaswant and Gurpreet's younger daughter; Parineet's sister (2022–present)
 Siya Bhatia as Simar Kakkar aka Babli: Mandeep and Harman's daughter, Vikram's sister, Parineet and Nupur's cousin (2022–present)
Arpana Agarwal as Mandeep Kakkar: Harman's wife, Vikram and Simar's mother (2022–present) 
Jeetu Vazirani as Harman Kakkar: Jaswant's younger brother; Mandeep's husband; Vikram and Simar's father (2022–present)
Anjali Mukhi / Alka Mogha as Gurinder Bajwa: Karanvir's widow, Rajeev, Keerti and Amit's mother (2022–present)
Aakash Talwar as Amit Bajwa: Gurinder and Karanvir's elder son; Rajeev and Keerti's brother; Chandrika's husband (2022–present)
Vaishnavi Mahant as Parminder Bajwa: Rajveer's wife; Simmi, Balwinder and Monty's mother (2022–present) 
 Bobby Parvez / Arup Pal as Rajveer Bajwa: Karanvir's brother; Parminder's husband; Simmi, Balwinder and Monty's father (2022–present)
Tiara Gujral as Keerti Bajwa: Gurinder and Karanvir's daughter; Rajeev and Amit's sister (2022–present)
Rishi Grover as Monty Bajwa: Parminder and Rajveer's son; Rajeev, Keerti and Amit's cousin; Simmi and Balwinder's brother (2022–present)
 Neena Cheema as Beeji: Karanvir and Rajveer's mother,Rajeev, Keerti , Amit, Monty , Simmi and Balwinder's paternal grandmother(2022–present)
Bhavya Chauhan as Shreya Singh: Neetii and Rajeev's friend (2022)
Utkarsh Gupta as Ajay Kumar: Neetii and Rajeev’s friend (2022)
Kaajal Chauhan as Shalu Sharma: Parineet and Neetii's friend (2022–present)
 Nil Uttam Kumar Parekh as Veer: Ajay's brother (2023)
Vivan Singh Rajput as Rocky Juneja: Sukhwinder's son; Neetii's brother (2022)
Sonia Shrivastava as Sukhwinder Juneja: Kanwal's sister; Neetii and Rocky's mother (2022–present)
 Hemant Choudhary as Devraj Malhotra: Varun's father (2022)
Prashant Sethi as Varun Malhotra: Devraj's son, Parineet's ex-fiancé (2022) 
Amit Kapoor as Kanwal Juneja: Sukhwinder's brother (2022)
Sonal Vengurlekar as Kiran Kapoor: Mukhiyaji's daughter; Parineet and Neetii's friend. (2022)

Special appearances
Priyanka Choudhary as Tejo Kaur Sandhu from Udaariyaan (2022)
Ankit Gupta as Fateh Singh Virk from Udaariyaan (2022) 
Sana Sayyad as Sejal Kotadiya from Spy Bahu (2022)
Priyal Mahajan as Purvi Virendra Pratap Singh from Molkki (2022)
Anita Raj as Kulwant Kaur Dhillon from Choti Sarrdaarni (2022) 
Surabhi Das as Nima Denzongpa from Nima Denzongpa (2022)
Mohammed Iqbal Khan as Virat Sethi from Nima Denzongpa (2022)
Sangita Ghosh as Swaran from Swaran Ghar (2022)
Kritika Singh Yadav as Pratiksha Parekh from Pyar Ke Saat Vachan Dharampatnii

References

External links
  on Colors

Balaji Telefilms television series
2022 Indian television series debuts
Indian drama television series
Colors TV original programming
Hindi-language television shows
Indian romance television series